The Geneva Summit of 1985  was a Cold War-era meeting in Geneva, Switzerland. It was held on November 19 and 20, 1985, between U.S. President Ronald Reagan and Soviet General Secretary Mikhail Gorbachev.  The two leaders met for the first time to hold talks on international diplomatic relations and the arms race.

Run-up to the summit
Both the Soviet Union and the United States were seeking to cut the number of nuclear weapons, with the Soviets seeking to halve the number of nuclear-equipped bombers and missiles, and the U.S. desiring to ensure that neither side gained a first-strike advantage, and to protect rights to have defensive systems. Diplomats struggled to come up with planned results in advance, with Soviets rejecting the vast majority of the items that U.S. negotiators proposed. With the meeting planned months in advance, the two superpowers used the opportunity to posture and to stake their positions in the court of public opinion. Reagan's security advisor Robert McFarlane announced that they were having "real trouble establishing a dialogue" with the Soviets, and announced a first test for the Strategic Defense Initiative missile defense. The Soviets announced a unilateral moratorium on underground nuclear tests and invited the Americans to join them, a request that was rebuffed.

Meeting
On November 19, 1985, U.S. president Ronald Reagan and Soviet General Secretary Mikhail Gorbachev met for the first time, in Geneva, to hold talks on international diplomatic relations and the arms race. The meeting was held at Fleur d'Eau, a villa in Versoix. Gorbachev later said: "We viewed the Geneva meeting realistically, without grand expectations, yet we hoped to lay the foundations for a serious dialogue in the future." Similar to former president Eisenhower in 1955, Reagan believed that a personal relationship among leaders was the necessary first step to breaking down the barriers of tension that existed between the two countries. Reagan's goal was to convince Gorbachev that America desired peace above all else. Reagan described his hopes for the summit as a "mission for peace". The first thing Reagan said to Gorbachev was "The United States and the Soviet Union are the two greatest countries on Earth, the superpowers. They are the only ones who can start World War 3, but also the only two countries that could bring peace to the world". He then emphasized the personal similarities between the two leaders, with both being born in similar "rural hamlets in the middle of their respective countries" and the great responsibilities they held.

At one point during the 1985 Geneva Summit, President Ronald Reagan and Soviet Premier Mikhail Gorbachev took a break from negotiations to take a walk. Only their private interpreters were present and for years, the details of what they talked about were kept secret from both the Russian and American public. During a 2009 interview with Charlie Rose and Reagan’s Secretary of State George Shultz, Gorbachev revealed that Reagan asked him point-blank if they could set aside their differences in case the world was invaded by aliens.

Their first meeting exceeded their time limit by over a half an hour. A Reagan assistant asked Secretary of State George Shultz whether he should interrupt the meeting to end it by its allotted time. Shultz responded, "If you think so, then you shouldn't have this job." The first day, Mikhail Gorbachev argued that the United States did not trust them and that its ruling class was trying to keep the people uneasy. Ronald Reagan countered that the Soviets had been acting aggressively and suggested the Soviets were overly paranoid about the United States (The Soviets had refused to allow American planes use Soviet airfields in post-World War II Germany). They broke for lunch and Reagan promised Gorbachev he'd have a chance to rebut. They talked outside for about two hours on the Strategic Defense Initiative, but both stood firm.  Gorbachev accepted Reagan's invitation to the United States in a year, and Reagan was invited to do the same in 1987. On the second day, Reagan went after human rights, saying that he did not want to tell Gorbachev how to run his country, but that he should ease up on emigration restrictions. Gorbachev claimed that the Soviets were comparable to the United States and quoted some feminists. The next session started with arguments about the arms race, then went into SDI. They agreed to a joint statement.

Impact
The two leaders held similar meetings over the next few years to further discuss the topics.  Gorbachev then held summits with George H. W. Bush after the latter became president, starting with the Malta Summit in 1989.

Key statements related to the summit

See also 
List of Soviet Union–United States summits (1943 to 1991)

Notes

References
 Matlock, Jr., Jack F. Reagan and Gorbachev: How the Cold War Ended, (New York: Random House Inc., 2004)
 Staff. Geneva Summit - President Reagan to Hold Pre-summit Speech, ABC News — retrieved January 24, 2007.

External links
Geneva Summit Possibilities from the Dean Peter Krogh Foreign Affairs Digital Archives
Interview with Henry Kissinger about the Summit from the Dean Peter Krogh Foreign Affairs Digital Archives

1985 in Switzerland
Foreign relations of the Soviet Union
Soviet Union–United States diplomatic conferences
Diplomatic conferences in Switzerland
20th-century diplomatic conferences
Events in Geneva
1985 in international relations
1985 conferences
20th century in Geneva
November 1985 events in Europe
Presidency of Ronald Reagan